Yunhe District is a district of Cangzhou, Hebei, China. Its name means "Grand Canal District", referring to the Grand Canal of China that passes through it.

Administrative Divisions
Subdistricts:
Shuiyuesi Subdistrict, Central Nanhuan Road Subdistrict, Nanhu Subdistrict, Shichang Subdistrict, Central Xihuan Avenue Subdistrict, Gongyuan Subdistrict

The only town is Xiaowangzhuang, and the only township is Nanchentun Township

External links

County-level divisions of Hebei
Cangzhou